The 1952 Massachusetts gubernatorial election was held on November 4, 1952. Republican Christian Herter defeated Democratic incumbent Paul A. Dever, Socialist Labor candidate Lawrence Gilfedder, Peace Progressive candidate Florence H. Luscomb, and Prohibition candidate Guy S. Williams.

Background 
The traditional formal pre-primary convention had been abolished, and Governor Dever vetoed an attempt to reinstate it; nevertheless, Republicans announced their intent to hold an unofficial grassroots convention in Worcester on June 28.

Democratic primary

Candidates
 Paul Dever, incumbent Governor

Results

Republican primary

Candidates
 Christian Herter, U.S. Representative from Boston

Withdrew 

 Howe Coolidge Amee, Cambridge attorney
 Laurence Curtis, former Treasurer and Receiver-General and nominee for Lieutenant Governor in 1950 (endorsed Herter and ran for U.S. House)
 Charles Gibbons, State Representative from Stoneham and House Minority Leader

Declined 

 Sumner Whittier, State Senator from Everett (ran for Lieutenant Governor)

Campaign 
The Republican primary was largely over before it began; the establishment cleared the field in favor of U.S. Representative Christian Herter.

In February, Laurence Curtis announced his candidacy, calling for a "wholesale cleanup of conditions at the State House that have destroyed the hope of a square deal for Massachusetts citizens." He had been the leading Republican vote-getter in 1950.

At the same time, U.S. Representative Christian Herter, vacationing in South Carolina, let it be known that he was willing to accept a draft for Governor. It was apparent that Herter, who supported Dwight D. Eisenhower for President, would have the support of the liberal Republican establishment, including Henry Cabot Lodge Jr., Leverett Saltonstall, Joseph W. Martin, and Sinclair Weeks. He announced his own candidacy two days after Curtis. Curtis pledged to remain in the race through the convention until the primary. However, he soon withdrew and endorsed Herter; Curtis was later elected to succeed Herter in Congress. Another potential candidate, Sumner Whittier, also immediately endorsed Herter and announced his campaign for Lieutenant Governor instead. Charles Gibbons initially said would enter the race against Herter but deferred until after the presidential primary, in which Herter was a candidate for delegate on the Eisenhower slate.

Herter spent much of the pre-convention period stumping for Eisenhower rather than his own candidacy. Even in appearances in the Commonwealth, he touted the presidential race to voters.

In early March, Cambridge attorney Howe Coolidge Amee entered the race, stating that he would refuse to abide by the pre-primary convention and would enter the primary directly. He framed his candidacy as merely a "protest against the scandalous and unconscionable measures employed by the hierarchy of my party in undertaking to foist upon us a candidate they must know cannot possibly be elected in November."

Results

General election

Candidates 

 Paul Dever, incumbent Governor (Democratic)
 Lawrence Gilfedder (Socialist Labor)
 Christian Herter, U.S. Representative from Boston (Republican)
 Florence H. Luscomb, architect and suffragette (Peace Progressive)
 Guy S. Williams (Prohibition)

Results

See also
 1951–1952 Massachusetts legislature

References

1952
Gubernatorial
Massachusetts
November 1952 events in the United States